Syed Zulfiqar Ali Shah is a Pakistani politician.

Political career
He was elected to the Provincial Assembly of Sindh as a candidate of Pakistan Peoples Party from Constituency PS-48 (Mirpur Khas-II) in 2018 Pakistani general election.

References

External links
Welcome to the Website of Provincial Assembly of Sindh: Member profile

Living people
Pakistan People's Party MPAs (Sindh)
Year of birth missing (living people)